Józef Potocki (1734/35–1802) was a Polish nobleman (szlachcic).

Józef was Great Krajczy of the Crown from 1776 to 1780, Rotmistrz of a Husar Choragiew, starost of Leżajsk and Knight of the Order of the White Eagle, awarded in 1769.

He was married to Anna Teresa Ossolińska and they had three children together: Jan Potocki, Seweryn Potocki and Maria Anna Potocka.

1734 births
1802 deaths
Potocki family
Starost of Leżajsk